Hema Henry Basnayake, QC (3 August 1902 – ?) was the 31st Chief Justice of Ceylon as well as the 29th Attorney General and 16th Solicitor General. He was appointed in 1956 succeeding acting Chellappah Nagalingam and was Chief Justice until 1964.

Legal career
Basnayake was admitted as an Advocate on 9 March 1927. Starting his legal practice in the Unofficial Bar, he acted as a Crown Counsel on several occasions between May 1928 to June 1932. On 20 June 1932, he was appointed Crown Counsel. From Oct 1937 to September 1937, he served as Commissioner for preparation and revision of the Legislative Enactments of Ceylon. In 1939, he served as acting Assistant Legal Draftsman and was promoted to Senior Crown Counsel on 1 October 1944. During this time he served on several occasions as acting Solicitor General. On 1 March 1945, he was appointed Solicitor General and took silks as a King's Counsel in 1946. He served as acting Attorney General on several occasions. On 23 October 1947, he was appointed a Puisne Justice of the Supreme Court of Ceylon. On 11 October 1951, he was appointed Attorney General and held the position until 31 December 1955. He prosecuted journalist Herbert Hulugalle on charge of contempt of court and secured a conviction resulting in a two day jail sentence for Hulugalle. Hulugalle was defended by J. R. Jayewardene. 

On 1 January 1956, he was appointed Chief Justice of Ceylon, succeeding Sir Alan Rose and held the position until his retirement on 31 July 1964. He was succeeded by Miliani Sansoni.

He succeeded Peter de Abrew as a trustee of Musaeus College in 1940 and served as Chairman of the Board of Trustees. Sinha Basnayake is his son.

References

1902 births
Year of death missing
20th-century Sri Lankan people
Chief justices of Sri Lanka
Attorneys General of Ceylon
Solicitors General of Ceylon
Ceylonese Queen's Counsel
Ceylonese advocates
Sinhalese judges
People from British Ceylon